Belfast Duncairn can refer to:

Belfast Duncairn (Northern Ireland Parliament constituency)
Belfast Duncairn (UK Parliament constituency)
Duncairn, Belfast, an electoral ward in Castle (District Electoral Area)